Bimber may refer to:

 Bimber (moonshine), a class of Polish alcoholic beverages
 Bimber, New South Wales, a locality in Finch County, Australia
 Bruce Bimber, introduced the idea of accelerated pluralism
 Oliver Bimber, German computer scientist

See also 
 Bhimber, a town in Azad Kashmir, Pakistan